Steve Harrison (born April 25, 1958) is a Canadian former professional ice hockey defenceman. He last played for the Fort Worth Fire of the Central Hockey League.

Career

Early career 
After playing with the Toronto Marlboros and briefly for the Markham Waxers, Harrison was drafted by the St. Louis Blues, 39th overall, in the 1978 NHL Amateur Draft. However, he did not play in the NHL and spent the majority of his career with the Salt Lake Golden Eagles during their time in Central Professional Hockey League. He has also played in the SM-liiga.

Coaching 
Prior to the 1993–94 CHL season, Harrison was named the head coach of the Fort Worth Fire. After the Fire finished with a combined record of 57-63-10 in 2 seasons, failing to qualify for the playoffs in both seasons, he was fired and replaced with Bill McDonald.

Harrison was named the head coach of the Toledo Storm for the 2003–04 ECHL season but was replaced mid-season by Nick Vitucci.

Harrison was named the head coach of the Danville Dashers for the 2014–15 FHL season. The Dashers won the Championship in 2017, but Harrison resigned as their head coach shortly after

In addition, coached New Mexico Renegades during their final season in New Mexico. and worked as a scout for the San Jose Sharks.

References

External links 

1958 births
Living people
Canadian ice hockey defencemen
Ice hockey people from Toronto
Sportspeople from Scarborough, Toronto